Maici River is a river of Amazonas state in north-western Brazil.

The Maici River is a left tributary of the dos Marmelos River. It flows through the Humaitá National Forest, a  sustainable use conservation unit created in 1998.

See also
List of rivers of Amazonas

References

Brazilian Ministry of Transport

Rivers of Amazonas (Brazilian state)